The Mexican Football Champion is the winner of the Primera División of football in Mexico.  Currently, there are two champions each calendar year with one champion for the Apertura ("opening") competition held in the autumn and one for the Clausura ("closing") competition in the spring.

Liga MX champions

Amateur Era Distrito Federal League Champions (1902–1943)

Notes

Primera División – League System Champions (1943–1970)

Primera División – Liguilla System Champions (1970–1996)

* Not official/recognized title
** Goal Difference.

Primera División – Short Tournament Champions (1996–present)

* Not official/recognized title
** Goal Difference.

Liga de Expansión MX champions

Segunda División – league system champions (1950–1994)
These teams were promoted to Primera División until 1994, when the league created Primera División A (Ascenso MX), automatically making Segunda División the third tier in Mexican football.

Primera División A – Liguilla system champions (1994–1996)

Primera División A – Liguilla and short tournament champions (1996–2009)

Liga de Ascenso – Liguilla and short tournament champions (2009–2012)

Ascenso MX – Liguilla and short tournament champions (2012–2020)

Liga de Expansion MX – Liguilla and short tournament champions (2020–present)

Liga Premier champions

Segunda División – league system (1950–1994)
These teams were promoted to Primera División until 1994, when the league created Primera División A, automatically making Segunda División the third tier in Mexican football.

Segunda División – Third level – league system (1994–1997)
These teams were promoted to Primera División A. In 1997, the season was divided into two tournaments: Winter and Summer.

Segunda División – short tournament (1996–2008)

 In bold, teams promoted to Primera División "A".

League Format – short tournament (2008–2012)

League Format – short tournament (2012–2018)

League Format – league system (2018–2021)

League Format – short tournament (2021–present)

Notes

Tercera División champions

References

See also
Mexican Primera División

champions
Mexico